Neraida is a village located along the river Aliakmon in Servia municipality, Kozani regional unit, in the Greek region of Macedonia. It is situated at an altitude of 280 meters. The postal code is 50100, while the telephone code is +30 24640. At the 2011 census the population was 148. 

The regional capital, Kozani, is 20 km away.

References

Populated places in Kozani (regional unit)